Maslina Strana  is a village in the municipality of Glamoč, Bosnia and Herzegovina.

Demographics 

According to the 2013 census, its population was 3, all Serbs.

Footnotes

Bibliography 

 

Populated places in Glamoč